The Sony Cyber-shot DSC-QX10 is an ultra-compact, mobile device-mountable  lens-type compact camera manufactured by Sony. Announced on September 3, 2014, the QX10 is one of Sony's "Smart Lens" cameras, alongside the QX1, QX30 and QX100, that are designed to be specifically used with a smartphone. It has a 1/2.3 inch backside-illuminated Exmor R™ CMOS sensor with 18.2 effective megapixels, sitting behind an ƒ/3.5 (wide) to ƒ/6.3 (telephoto) Sony G Lens. It has a 10x lossless optical zoom in a compact pancake lens-style body.

Specification

Technical specifications

See also
Sony SmartShot
Sony Cyber-shot
Sony DSC-QX100
Sony DSC-QX30

Camera lenses introduced in 2014
QX10
DSC-QX10
Superzoom cameras